The 1918 Camp Hancock football team represented Camp Hancock during the 1918 college football season.

The 66 points scored on Clemson remained the highest total scored on a Clemson team until 1931 and remains the third-highest total ever allowed by Clemson.

Schedule

References

Camp Hancock
Camp Hancock football